Steven Allan (born 22 September 1956) is  a former Australian rules footballer who played with St Kilda in the Victorian Football League (VFL).

Notes

External links 		
		
		
		
		
		
		
Living people
1956 births
Place of birth missing (living people)
Australian rules footballers from Victoria (Australia)
St Kilda Football Club players
Golden Point Football Club players